Andy or Andrew Edwards may refer to:

 Andy Edwards (footballer, born 1971), English footballer and manager
 Andy Edwards (footballer, born 1965), Welsh footballer
 Andy Edwards (musician), English drummer
 Andy Edwards (sculptor), English artist
 Andrew Edwards (cricketer) (born 1978), English cricketer
 Andrew David Edwards (born 1958), American serial killer